Chorla is a village in Belgaum district in the state of Karnataka. It is situated on border of Goa and Maharashtra. 

The Swaymbu Rameshwar Temple is also famous. It is a pilgrimage centre for people.

References

Villages in Belagavi district